Daniel James ter Braak (born 27 February 1991) is a Dutch International cricketer. He made his first-class debut for the Netherlands in the 2015–17 ICC Intercontinental Cup on 15 August 2017.

In July 2018, he was named in the Netherlands' One Day International (ODI) squad, for their series against Nepal. He made his ODI debut for the Netherlands against Nepal on 1 August 2018.

References

External links
 

1991 births
Living people
Dutch cricketers
Netherlands One Day International cricketers
Sportspeople from Rotterdam